Henri Michel (April 28, 1907 in Vidauban, Var – June 5, 1986 in Paris) was a French historian, who studied the Second World War. He created the Comité d'Histoire de la Deuxième Guerre Mondiale and the Revue d'Histoire de la Deuxième Guerre Mondiale.

Works
 Tragédie de la déportation, 1954.
 Histoire de la Résistance : (1940-1944), 1958.
 Les Mouvements clandestins en Europe (1938-1945), 1961.
 Les Courants de pensée de la Résistance, 1962.
 Histoire de la France libre, 1963.
 Jean Moulin l'unificateur, 1964.
 Combat : histoire d'un mouvement de Résistance de juillet 1940 à juillet 1943, 1967.
 Vichy : Année 1940, 1967.
 La Guerre de l'ombre ; La Résistance en Europe, 1970.
 La Drôle de guerre, 1971.
 La Seconde Guerre Mondiale, 1972.
 Pétain, Laval, Darlan, trois politiques ?, 1972.
 Les Fascismes, 1977.
 Pétain et le régime de Vichy, 1978.
 Le Procès de Riom, 1979.
 La Libération de Paris, 1980.
 La Défaite de la France (septembre 1939-juin 1940, 1980.
 Histoire de la France libre, 1980.
 Paris allemand, 1981.
 Paris résistant, 1982.
 Et Varsovie fut détruite, 1984.
 The shadow war : Resistance in Europe, 1939-1945, 1972.
 The Second World War, 1975.

References 

Historians of France
People from Var (department)
1907 births
1986 deaths
Historians of Vichy France
20th-century French historians
French male writers
Winners of the Prix Broquette-Gonin (literature)
Historians of World War II